Montalbán is a town in Venezuela, capital of the Montalbán Municipality in Carabobo.

References

Populated places in Carabobo